The 1984 Austrian Alpine Ski Championships (Österreichischen Alpinen Skimeisterschaften 1984) took place from 22 to 25 February in the District of Kitzbühel. The downhill events were held in Oberndorf, the giant slalom runs in Kirchberg and the slalom competition in Jochberg.

Men

Downhill 

Date: 22 February 1984
Place: Oberndorf
Piste: Penzing

Giant slalom 

Date: 24 February 1984
Place: Kirchberg

Slalom 

Date: 25 February 1984
Place: Jochberg

Combination 
The combination combines the results of the slalom, giant slalom and downhill events.

Women

Downhill 

Date: 22 February 1984
Place: Oberndorf
Piste: Penzing

Giant slalom 

Date: 23 February 1984
Place: Kirchberg

Slalom 

Date: 24 February 1984
Place: Jochberg

Combination 
The combination combines the results of the slalom, giant slalom and downhill events.

References 

1984 in sports
Kitzbühel District
Kitzbühel Alps
Sport in Tyrol (state)